The 2014–15 RC Lens season was the 109th professional season of the club since its creation in 1906. Lens returned to Ligue 1 after a three-year span in the second division. After their promotion however Lens were considered ineligible for their promotion due to a €10 million payment from shareholder Hafiz Mammadov missing in the accounts. This meant that despite their successes in the previous season, Lens would return to Ligue 2 no matter where they finished in the league. Despite their automatic demotion, the club happened to finish the season in 20th which nevertheless warranted relegation.

The club's stadium Stade Bollaert-Delelis was under renovation for the entirety of the season, ahead of the UEFA Euro 2016 tournament in France. Lens instead played the majority of their matches at Stade de la Licorne in Amiens and played four matches against higher-profile league teams at the French national stadium Stade de France in Saint-Denis.

Players

First team squad

French teams are limited to four players without EU citizenship. Hence, the squad list includes only the principal nationality of each player; several non-European players on the squad have dual citizenship with an EU country. Also, players from the ACP countries—countries in Africa, the Caribbean, and the Pacific that are signatories to the Cotonou Agreement—are not counted against non-EU quotas due to the Kolpak ruling.

 (on loan from Stade Rennes)

Competitions

Ligue 1

League table

Results summary

Results by round

Matches

Coupe de la Ligue

Coupe de France

References

Lens
RC Lens seasons